Marie Louise Anna Beaudet (December 5, 1859 – December 31, 1947) was a Canadian actress, singer and dancer for more than 50 years, starred in stage productions ranging from comic opera to Shakespeare, as well as music-hall and vaudeville, and appeared in 66 silent films.

Biography
Although she would say that she was born in Tours, France, Marie Louise Anna Beaudet was baptised in the parish of Saint-Louis-de-Lotbinière, province of Québec, Canada, in December 1859. She was the ninth child of Marie-Élisabeth (Eliza) Jobin dit Boisvert (born 1824) and farmer Clément Beaudet (1817–1863). The tragic loss of her father in 1863 and the subsequent move to Montréal deeply affected her childhood years. She was uprooted again in 1870 when her mother married Nathaniel B. Clapp and settled in Boston, Massachusetts. Eliza divorced her second husband six years later and moved to New York City with Louise and eldest daughter Marie Arceline (Amy).

Louise performed in amateur productions of H.M.S. Pinafore before being "discovered" by actor Frank Drew of the famous Drew-Barrymore clan who offered her the role of Violet in his production of The Life of an Artist and the major role of Fanchon in Fanchon, The Cricket, in January and February 1879, at the Budlong's Opera House in Jersey City. In March of that year, she was hired by James C. Duff to play the duchess in The Little Duke at Booth's Theatre in New York and in the fall, Maurice Grau's French Opera Company gave her the same role of Blanche, la duchesse de Parthenay, in the American version of Le Petit Duc. The French actress Maire-Aimée Tronchon, known as Mlle Aimée, who starred in this production, took Louise under her wing. "Anything that I have ever done in comic opera I owe to Aimée", she would later confide to Alan Dale.[3]

Shortly after, she joined the Baldwin Theatre Stock Company of San Francisco where she played the ingénue roles. It was there that she met one of the greatest dramatic actors of that period the actor Daniel E. Bandmann who encouraged her to take on more serious roles and with whom she became romantically involved. They founded a theatrical touring company, Beaudet playing all of Shakespeare's principal female roles to Bandmann's leading men. They toured the world together for nearly four years, covering more than 70,000 miles. [10] They continued touring successfully in North America and England with such productions as A Strange Case, Dr. Jekyll & Mr. Hyde, Narcisse, East Lynn, The Corsican Brothers, etc. before ending their famous relationship in 1889.

In August of that year, "Little Miss Beaudet" returned to the New York stage as a member of the James C. Duff Opera Company and rapidly became one of the "petites" favourites playing such roles as: Chilina in the comic opera Paola, or the First of the Vendettas, Maid Marian in Robin Hood and his Merry Men or Babes in the Woods, Pitti-Sing in The Mikado, Edith in Pirates of Penzance, Iolanthe in Iolanthe, Lady Angela in Patience, Christel in The Tyrolean and "la Jolie Plaignante" in Trial by Jury.

In March 1891, Rudolph Aronson asked her to join his Casino Theatre Company for the theatrical season. Louise Beaudet played Paresina in the opera Apollo; or the Oracle of Delphi with Lillian Russell, Toffana in the adaptation of the burlesque opera Indigo, then again Christel in The Tyrolean, co-starring Marie Tempest and also Frinke in The Jolly Students.

In 1892, she accepted the principal female role of Elizabeth in Pauline Hall's production of the comic opera in two acts Puritania, or the Earl and the Maid of Salem.

In 1893, Beaudet starred in the eight-month run of Imre Kiralfy's America during the World's Columbian Exposition in Chicago, then began her own touring opera company, performing repertoire of French Opéra bouffe. They presented Jacinta, the Maid of Manzanillo at the Castle Square Theatre in Boston and at Miner's Fifth Avenue Theatre in New York with Louise in the leading role and The Dragoon's Daughter in Boston and Chicago before breaking-up the company due to the lack of funds.

In 1895, she was hired by the great George Edwardes to replace Marie Tempest in the production of An Artist's Model at Daly's Theatre in London, England. The role of Adele gave her the chance to display her lovely mezzo-soprano voice in popular songs such as : Love is a Man's Delight, a Fancy of Today; On a Silent Summer's Night, When the Moon Shone Clear and Bright. She then toured quite successfully throughout England with Mr. Edwardes's theatrical company.

Between 1896 and 1899, Louise Beaudet was at the height of her popularity as a music-hall and vaudeville queen. She became one of the best paid stage performers. In June 1897, she was invited at Buckingham Palace for a Royal Command Performance before Queen Victoria .[11] She was adored by English, South African and American audiences alike and continually made headlines. Her power of fascination, her talent, her panache, her fabulous French gowns and bon goût filled theatre halls. They wrote her songs, put her photographs on cigarette cards and associated her name with different brands of products. The famous Flo Ziegfeld asked her to star in his lavish 1899 production of Mademoiselle Fifi at the Manhattan Theatre. The play became the talk of the town. All New York showed up to see her enter the stage in her striking costume covered with more than 60 hand-sewn jewels. This "belle" of the Belle Époque continued playing first roles on stage until her voice could no longer support them.

In 1912, she joined the Edison Studios in the Bronx and then the Company Players at Vitagraph Studios in Manhattan. She wrote a few scenarios and played supporting roles in sixty-six black and white silent films, including Heartbroken Shep (1913) with Helen Costello, Sawdust and Salome (1914) with Van Dyke Brooke, My Official Wife (1914) with Clara Kimball Young, The Battle Cry of Peace/A Call to Arms Against War (1915) where she was acclaimed for bringing educational acting to the screen [12], A Price for Folly (1915) with Edith Storey, Her Lord and Master (1921) with Alice Joy and The Gold Diggers (1923) with Hope Hampton. Her last appearance on screen was in 1926 at the age of 67.

But Louise Beaudet continued to perform on Broadway and in theatres in Baltimore, Washington, Philadelphia, Cleveland, Boston and Chicago until her retirement in 1934.

She died on December 31, 1947, in City Hospital, Manhattan, aged 88. She is buried with her sister Arcelina Martel at Calvary Cemetery, in Woodside, New York. The fact that she always refused to divulge her true age explains why the dates on her death certificate and on her tombstone are erroneous. She left no descendants.

Filmography

Broadway performances
 Mother Lode (1934)
 White Lilacs (1928-1929)
 My Maryland (1927-1928)
 Nature's Nobleman (1921-1922) 
 One Night in Rome (1919-1920) 
 Flo-Flo (1917-1918) 
 The Chimes of Normandy (1907) 
 Mademoiselle Fifi (1899)
 Jacinta (1893-1894)
 Puritania, or The Earl and the Maid of Salem (1892-1893)
 Jolly Students (1891)
 Indigo (1891)
 Apollo, or the Oracle of Delphi (1891)
 The Tyrolean (1891-1892)
 The Mikado (1889-1890)
 Paola (1889)
 Dead or Alive (1889)
 A Strange Case, Dr. Jekyll & Mr.Hyde (1888)
 Narcisse (1886)

Gallery

References
1. " A Well-Rounded Career", New York Times, September 29, 1918.
2. Graham, Franklin, Histrionics Montreal, Toronto: W. Briggs, 1902.
3. Dale, Alan, Queens of the Stage, New York: G.W. Dillingham, 1890, pp. 233–245.
4. Brown, Thomas Allston, A History of the New York Stage, Vol. 3, New York: Dodd, Mead and Company, 1903.
5. 
6. Scoot, Clement, ed.,The Theatre: A Monthly Review of Drama, Music and the Fine Arts, Vol. XII, London: Strand Publishing Co., 1888.
7. Archer, William, The Theatrical World of 1897, London: Walter Scott Ltd., 1897.
8. "Louise Beaudet, 87, An Actress 50 Years", New York Times, January 1, 1948.
9. Saint-Pierre, Marjolaine, Louise Beaudet, De Lotbinière à Broadway, 1859-1947, Québec: Septentrion, 2017.
10. Bandmann, Daniel E., An Actor's Tour: Or Seventy Thousand Miles with Shakespeare, New York: Brentano Brothers, 1885.
11. "Performed before the Queen at Buckingham", The Boston Herald, December 12, 1915.
12. "Louise Beaudet bring Educational Acting to the Screen", Tulsa World, January 11, 1916.

External links

1859 births
1947 deaths
American stage actresses
American silent film actresses
19th-century American actresses
20th-century American actresses
Canadian emigrants to the United States
American Shakespearean actresses